Warwood Fire Station is a historic fire station located at Wheeling, Ohio County, West Virginia. It was built in 1923, and is a two-story, rectangular brick building in the Classical Revival-style.  The three-bay front facade has two garage openings with a single center entrance.  Its entablature is a centered limestone panel incised with "FIRE DEPARTMENT NO. 11."

It was listed on the National Register of Historic Places in 1996.

References

Buildings and structures in Wheeling, West Virginia
Fire stations on the National Register of Historic Places in West Virginia
Neoclassical architecture in West Virginia
Fire stations completed in 1923
National Register of Historic Places in Wheeling, West Virginia
1923 establishments in West Virginia